Trictenotoma is a genus of beetle in the Trictenotomidae family. They have scales covering the elytra that fluoresce under ultraviolet light. Based on similarities in the larval characteristics, the family is thought to be closely related to the Salpingidae.

Species
 Trictenotoma childreni Gray, 1832
 Trictenotoma cindarella Kriesche, 1921
 Trictenotoma davidi Deyrolle, 1875
 Trictenotoma formosana Kriesche, 1920
 Trictenotoma grayi Smith, 1851
 Trictenotoma lansbergi Dohrn, 1882
 Trictenotoma mniszechi Deyrolle, 1875
 Trictenotoma mouhoti Deyrolle, 1875
 Trictenotoma pollocki 
 Trictenotoma templetoni Westwood, 1848
 Trictenotoma westwoodi Deyrolle, 1875

References

External links 
 Biolib
 Joel Hallan's Biology Catalog — Texas A&M Univ.

Tenebrionoidea genera
Trictenotomidae